Esertepe can refer to:

 Esertepe, Kemaliye
 Esertepe Park
 Esertepe Aqua Center